The 1985 Swedish Golf Tour was the second season of the Swedish Golf Tour, a series of professional golf tournaments held in Sweden.

Schedule
The season consisted of nine events played between May and September.

Order of Merit

Source:

References

Swedish Golf Tour
Swedish Golf Tour